European route E 773 is a European B class road in Bulgaria, connecting the village of Popovica and the cities of Stara Zagora and Burgas.

Route 

: Chirpan - Stara Zagora - Burgas
: Burgas

See also
 Roads in Bulgaria
 Highways in Bulgaria

External links 
 UN Economic Commission for Europe: Overall Map of E-road Network (2007)
 International E-road network

International E-road network
Roads in Bulgaria